Anthe  is a very small natural satellite of Saturn lying between the orbits of Mimas and Enceladus. It is also known as Saturn XLIX; its provisional designation was S/2007 S 4. It is named after one of the Alkyonides; the name means flowery. It is the sixtieth confirmed moon of Saturn.

It was discovered by the Cassini Imaging Team in images taken on 30 May 2007. Once the discovery was made, a search of older Cassini images revealed it in observations from as far back as June 2004. It was first announced on 18 July 2007.

Anthe is visibly affected by a perturbing 10:11 mean-longitude resonance with the much larger Mimas. This causes its osculating orbital elements to vary with an amplitude of about 20 km in semi-major axis on a timescale of about 2 Earth years. The close proximity to the orbits of Pallene and Methone suggests that these moons may form a dynamical family.

Material blasted off Anthe by micrometeoroid impacts is thought to be the source of the Anthe Ring Arc, a faint partial ring about Saturn co-orbital with the moon first detected in June 2007.

References 

Notes

Citations

Sources

External links 

 From Dark Obscurity... A Tiny New Saturnian Moon Comes To Light 

Moons of Saturn
20070530
Moons with a prograde orbit